Very low frequency or VLF is the ITU designation for radio frequencies (RF) in the range of 3–30 kHz, corresponding to wavelengths from 100 to 10 km, respectively. The band is also known as the myriameter band or myriameter wave as the wavelengths range from one to ten myriameters (an obsolete metric unit equal to 10 kilometers). Due to its limited bandwidth, audio (voice) transmission is highly impractical in this band, and therefore only low data rate coded signals are used. The VLF band is used for a few radio navigation services, government time radio stations (broadcasting time signals to set radio clocks) and for secure military communication.  Since VLF waves can penetrate at least 40 meters (131 ft) into saltwater, they are used for military communication with submarines.

Propagation characteristics
Because of their long wavelengths, VLF radio waves can diffract around large obstacles and so are not blocked by mountain ranges, and can propagate as ground waves following the curvature of the Earth and so are not limited by the horizon. Ground waves are absorbed by the resistance of the Earth and are less important beyond several hundred to a thousand miles, and the main mode of long-distance propagation is an Earth-ionosphere waveguide mechanism. The Earth is surrounded by a conductive layer of electrons and ions in the upper atmosphere at the bottom of the ionosphere called the D layer at 60–90 km (37–56 miles) altitude, which reflects VLF radio waves. The conductive ionosphere and the conductive Earth form a horizontal "duct" a few VLF wavelengths high, which acts as a waveguide confining the waves so they don't escape into space. The waves travel in a zig-zag path around the Earth, reflected alternately by the Earth and the ionosphere, in transverse magnetic (TM) mode.

VLF waves have very low path attenuation, 2–3 dB per 1,000 km, with little of the "fading" experienced at higher frequencies.  This is because  VLF waves are reflected from the bottom of the ionosphere, while higher frequency shortwave signals are returned to Earth from higher layers in the ionosphere, the F1 and F2 layers, by a refraction process, and spend most of their journey in the ionosphere, so they are much more affected by ionization gradients and turbulence. Therefore, VLF transmissions are very stable and reliable, and are used for long-distance communication. Propagation distances of 5,000–20,000 km have been realized. However, atmospheric noise ("sferics") is high in the band, including such phenomena as "whistlers", caused by lightning.
 VLF waves can penetrate seawater to a depth of at least 10–40 meters (30–130 feet), depending on the frequency employed and the salinity of the water, so they are used to communicate with submarines.
 VLF waves at certain frequencies have been found to cause electron precipitation.
 VLF waves used to communicate with submarines have created an artificial bubble around the Earth that can protect it from solar flares and coronal mass ejections; this occurred through interaction with high-energy radiation particles.

Antennas

A major practical drawback to the VLF band is that because of the length of the waves, full size resonant antennas (half wave dipole or quarter wave monopole antennas) cannot be built because of their physical height. So practical transmitting antennas are electrically short, a small fraction of the length at which they would be self-resonant. Due to their low radiation resistance (often less than one ohm) they are inefficient, radiating only 10% to 50% of the transmitter power at most, with the rest of the power dissipated in the antenna/ground system resistances. Very high power transmitters (~1 megawatt) are required for long-distance communication, so the efficiency of the antenna is an important factor.

VLF transmitting antennas 
High power VLF transmitting stations use capacitively-loaded monopole antennas. These are very large wire antennas, up to several kilometers long. They consist of a series of steel radio masts, linked at the top with a network of cables, often shaped like an umbrella or clotheslines. Either the towers themselves or vertical wires serve as monopole radiators, and the horizontal cables form a capacitive top-load to increase the current in the vertical wires, increasing the radiated power and efficiency of the antenna. High-power stations use variations on the umbrella antenna such as the "delta" and "trideco" antennas, or multiwire flattop (triatic) antennas. For low-power transmitters, inverted-L and T antennas are used.

Due to the low radiation resistance, to minimize power dissipated in the ground these antennas require extremely low resistance ground (Earthing) systems, consisting of radial networks of buried copper wires under the antenna. To minimize dielectric losses in the soil, the ground conductors are buried shallowly, only a few inches in the ground, and the ground surface near the antenna is protected by copper ground screens. Counterpoise systems have also been used, consisting of radial networks of copper cables supported several feet above the ground under the antenna.

A large loading coil is required at the antenna feed point to cancel the capacitive reactance of the antenna to make it resonant. At VLF the design of this coil is challenging; it must have low resistance at the operating RF frequency, high , and must withstand the extremely high voltage on the antenna. The RF resistance is usually reduced by using litz wire.  
   
The high capacitance and inductance and low resistance of the antenna-loading coil combination makes it act electrically like a high  tuned circuit. VLF antennas have very narrow bandwidth and to change the transmitting frequency requires a variable inductor (variometer) to tune the antenna. The large VLF antennas used for high-power transmitters usually have bandwidths of only 50–100 hertz, and when transmitting frequency-shift keying (FSK), the usual mode, the resonant frequency of the antenna must sometimes be dynamically shifted with the modulation, between the two FSK frequencies. The high  results in very high voltages (up to 200 kV) on the antenna and very good insulation is required. Large VLF antennas usually operate in 'voltage limited' mode: the maximum power of the transmitter is limited by the voltage the antenna can accept without air breakdown, corona, and arcing from the antenna.

Dynamic antenna tuning 
The bandwidth of large capacitively loaded VLF antennas is so narrow (50–100 Hz) that even the small frequency shifts of FSK and MSK modulation may exceed it, throwing the antenna out of resonance, causing the antenna to reflect some power back down the feedline. A recent alternative used in some military VLF transmitters is a circuit which dynamically shifts the antenna's resonant frequency between the two output frequencies with the modulation. This is accomplished with a saturable reactor in series with the antenna loading coil. This is a ferromagnetic core inductor with a second control winding through which a DC current flows, which controls the inductance by magnetizing the core, changing its permeability. The keying datastream is applied to the control winding. So when the frequency of the transmitter is shifted between the '1' and '0' frequencies, the saturable reactor changes the inductance in the antenna resonant circuit to shift the antenna resonant frequency to follow the transmitter's  frequency.

VLF receiving antennas 
The requirements for receiving antennas are less stringent, because of the high level of natural atmospheric noise in the band. At VLF frequencies atmospheric radio noise is far above the receiver noise introduced by the receiver circuit and determines the receiver signal-to-noise ratio. So small inefficient receiving antennas can be used, and the low voltage signal from the antenna can simply be amplified by the receiver without introducing significant noise. Ferrite loop antennas are usually used for reception.

Modulation 
Because of the small bandwidth of the band, and the extremely narrow bandwidth of the antennas used, it is impractical to transmit audio signals (AM or FM radiotelephony). A typical AM radio signal with a bandwidth of 10 kHz would occupy one third of the VLF band. More significantly, it would be difficult to transmit any distance because it would require an antenna with 100 times the bandwidth of current VLF antennas, which due to the Chu-Harrington limit would be enormous in size. Therefore, only text data can be transmitted, at low bit rates. In military networks   frequency-shift keying (FSK) modulation is used to transmit radioteletype data using 5 bit ITA2 or 8 bit ASCII character codes. A small frequency shift of 30–50 hertz is used due to the small bandwidth of the antenna.

In high power VLF transmitters, to increase the allowable data rate, a special form of FSK called minimum-shift keying (MSK) is used. This is required due to the high  of the antenna. The huge capacitively-loaded antenna and loading coil form a high  tuned circuit, which stores oscillating electrical energy. The  of large VLF antennas is typically over 200; this means the antenna stores far more energy (200 times as much) than is supplied or radiated in any single cycle of the transmitter current. The energy is stored alternately as electrostatic energy in the topload and ground system, and magnetic energy in the vertical wires and loading coil. VLF antennas typically operate "voltage-limited", with the voltage on the antenna close to the limit that the insulation will stand, so they will not tolerate any abrupt change in the voltage or current from the transmitter without arcing or other insulation problems. As described below, MSK is able to modulate the transmitted wave at higher data rates without causing voltage spikes on the antenna.

The three types of modulation that have been used in VLF transmitters are:
Continuous Wave (CW), Interrupted Continuous Wave (ICW), or On-Off Keying Morse code radiotelegraphy transmission with unmodulated carrier. The carrier is turned on and off, with carrier on representing the Morse code "dots" and "dashes" and carrier off representing spaces. The simplest and earliest form of radio data transmission, this was used from the beginning of the 20th century to the 1960s in commercial and military VLF stations. Because of the high antenna  the carrier cannot be switched abruptly on and off but requires a long time constant, many cycles, to build up the oscillating energy in the antenna when the carrier turns on, and many cycles to dissipate the stored energy when the carrier turns off.  This limits the data rate that can be transmitted to 15–20 words/minute. CW is now only used in small hand-keyed transmitters, and for testing large transmitters.
Frequency-shift keying (FSK) FSK is the second oldest and second simplest form of digital radio data modulation, after CW. For FSK, the carrier shifted between two frequencies, one representing the binary digit '1' and the other representing binary '0'. For example, a frequency of 9070 Hz might be used to indicate a '1' and the frequency  9020 Hz, 50 Hz lower, to indicate a '0'. The two frequencies are generated by a continuously-running frequency synthesizer. The transmitter is periodically switched between these frequencies to represent 8 bit ASCII codes for the characters of the message.  A problem at VLF is that when the frequency is switched the two sine waves usually have different phases, which creates a sudden phase-shift transient which can cause arcing on the antenna. To avoid arcing, FSK can only be used at slow rates of 50–75 bit/s.  
Minimum-shift keying (MSK) A continuous phase version of FSK designed specifically for small bandwidths, this was adopted by naval VLF stations in the 1970s to increase the data rate and is now the standard mode used in military VLF transmitters. If the two frequencies representing '1' and '0' are 50 Hz apart, the standard frequency shift used in military VLF stations, their phases coincide every 20 ms. In MSK the frequency of the transmitter is switched only when the two sine waves have the same phase, at the point both sine waves cross zero in the same direction.  This creates a smooth continuous transition between the waves, avoiding transients which can cause stress and arcing on the antenna. MSK can be used at data rates up to 300 bit/s, or about 35 ASCII characters (8 bits each) per second, approximately 450 words per minute.

Applications

Early wireless telegraphy 
Historically, this band was used for long distance transoceanic radio communication during the wireless telegraphy era between about 1905 and 1925. Nations built networks of high-power LF and VLF radiotelegraphy stations that transmitted text information by Morse code, to communicate with other countries, their colonies, and naval fleets. Early attempts were made to use radiotelephone using amplitude modulation and single-sideband modulation within the band starting from 20 kHz, but the result was unsatisfactory because the available bandwidth was insufficient to contain the sidebands.

In the 1920s the discovery of the skywave (skip) radio propagation method allowed lower power transmitters operating at high frequency to communicate at similar distances by reflecting their radio waves off a layer of ionized atoms in the ionosphere, and long-distance radio communication stations switched to the shortwave frequencies. The Grimeton VLF transmitter at Grimeton near Varberg in Sweden, one of the few remaining transmitters from that era that has been preserved as a historical monument, can be visited by the public at certain times, such as on Alexanderson Day.

Navigation beacons and time signals 
Due to its long propagation distances and stable phase characteristics, during the 20th century the VLF band was used for long range hyperbolic radio navigation systems which allowed ships and aircraft to determine their geographical position by comparing the phase of radio waves received from fixed VLF navigation beacon transmitters.

The worldwide Omega system used frequencies from 10 to 14 kHz, as did Russia's Alpha.

VLF was also used for standard time and frequency broadcasts. In the US, the time signal station WWVL began transmitting a 500 W signal on 20 kHz in August 1963. It used frequency-shift keying (FSK) to send data, shifting between 20 kHz and 26 kHz. The WWVL service was discontinued in July 1972.

Geophysical and atmospheric measurement 
Naturally occurring signals in the VLF band are used by geophysicists for long range lightning location and for research into atmospheric phenomena such as the aurora. Measurements of whistlers are employed to infer the physical properties of the magnetosphere.

Geophysicists use VLF-electromagnetic receivers to measure conductivity in the near surface of the Earth.

VLF signals can be measured as a geophysical electromagnetic survey that relies on transmitted currents inducing secondary responses in conductive geologic units. A VLF anomaly represents a change in the attitude of the electromagnetic vector overlying conductive materials in the subsurface.

Military communications 
Powerful VLF transmitters are used by the military to communicate with their forces worldwide. The advantage of VLF frequencies is their long range, high reliability, and the prediction that in a nuclear war VLF communications will be less disrupted by nuclear explosions than higher frequencies. Since it can penetrate seawater VLF is used by the military to communicate with submarines near the surface, while ELF frequencies are used for deeply submerged subs.

Examples of naval VLF transmitters are
 Britain's Skelton Transmitting Station in Skelton, Cumbria
 Germany's DHO38 in Rhauderfehn, which transmits on 23.4 kHz with a power of 800 kW
 U.S. Jim Creek Naval Radio Station in Oso, Washington state, which transmits on 24.8 kHz with a power of 1.2 MW
 U.S. Cutler Naval Radio Station at Cutler, Maine which transmits on 24 kHz with 1.8 MW.

Since 2004 the US Navy has stopped using ELF transmissions, with the statement that improvements in VLF communication has made them unnecessary, so it may have developed technology to allow submarines to receive VLF transmissions while at operating depth.

Submarine and subterranean communications 

High power land-based and aircraft transmitters in countries that operate submarines send signals that can be received thousands of miles away. Transmitter sites typically cover great areas (many acres or square kilometers), with transmitted power anywhere from 20 kW to 2,000 kW. Submarines receive signals from land based and aircraft transmitters using some form of towed antenna that floats just under the surface of the water – for example a Buoyant Cable Array Antenna (BCAA).

Modern receivers use sophisticated digital signal processing techniques to remove the effects of atmospheric noise (largely caused by lightning strikes around the world) and adjacent channel signals, extending the useful reception range. Strategic nuclear bombers of the United States Air Force receive VLF signals as part of hardened nuclear resilient operations.

Two alternative character sets may be used: 5 bit ITA2 or 8 bit ASCII. Because these are military transmissions they are almost always encrypted for security reasons. Although it is relatively easy to receive the transmissions and convert them into a string of characters, enemies cannot decode the encrypted messages; military communications usually use unbreakable one-time pad ciphers since the amount of text is so small.

VLF can also penetrate soil and rock for some distance, so these frequencies are also used for through-the-earth mine communications systems.

Amateur use
The frequency range below 8.3 kHz is not allocated by the International Telecommunication Union and in some nations may be used license-free.
Radio amateurs in some countries have been granted permission (or have assumed permission) to operate at frequencies below 8.3 kHz.

Operations tend to congregate around the frequencies 8.27 kHz, 6.47 kHz, 5.17 kHz, and 2.97 kHz. Transmissions typically last from one hour up to several days and both receiver and transmitter must have their frequency locked to a stable reference such as a GPS disciplined oscillator or a rubidium standard in order to support such long duration coherent detection and decoding.

Amateur equipment
Radiated power from amateur stations is very small, ranging from 1 μW to 100 μW for fixed base station antennas, and up to 10 mW from kite or balloon antennas. Despite the low power, stable propagation with low attenuation in the earth-ionosphere cavity enable very narrow bandwidths to be used to reach distances up to several thousand kilometers. The modes used are QRSS, MFSK, and coherent BPSK.

The transmitter generally consists of an audio amplifier of a few hundred watts, an impedance matching transformer, a loading coil and a large wire antenna. Receivers employ an electric field probe or magnetic loop antenna, a sensitive audio preamplifier, isolating transformers, and a PC sound card to digitise the signal. Extensive digital signal processing is required to retrieve the weak signals from beneath interference from power line harmonics and VLF radio atmospherics. Useful received signal strengths are as low as  volts/meter (electric field) and  tesla (magnetic field), with signaling rates typically between 1 and 100 bits per hour.

PC based reception

VLF signals are often monitored by radio amateurs using simple homemade VLF radio receivers based on personal computers (PCs). An aerial in the form of a coil of insulated wire is connected to the input of the soundcard of the PC (via a jack plug) and placed a few meters away from it. Fast Fourier transform (FFT) software in combination with a sound card allows reception of all frequencies below the Nyquist frequency simultaneously in the form of spectrogrammes.

Because CRT monitors are strong sources of noise in the VLF range, it is recommended to record the spectrograms with any PC CRT monitors turned off. These spectrograms show many signals, which may include VLF transmitters and the horizontal electron beam deflection of TV sets. The strength of the signal received can vary with a sudden ionospheric disturbance. These cause the ionization level to increase in the ionosphere producing a rapid change to the amplitude and phase of the received VLF signal.

List of VLF transmissions 
For a more detailed list, see List of VLF-transmitters

See also
Communication with submarines
OMEGA Navigation System, 1971–1997
Radio atmospheric

References

Further reading

External links
 Longwave club of America
 Radio waves below 22 kHz
 VLF Discussion Group
 Tomislav Stimac, "Definition of frequency bands (VLF, ELF... etc.)".
 PC-based VLF-reception
 Gallery of VLF-signals
 NASA live streaming ELF -> VLF Receiver NOTE:  As of 05/03/2014, the "Listen live" links are down, but the site has some previously recorded examples to listen to.
 World Wide Lightning Location Network
 Stanford University VLF group
 University of Louisville VLF Monitor
 Larry's Very Low Frequency site
 Mark's Live Online VLF Receiver, UK
 IW0BZD VLF TUBE receiver
 Internet based VLF listening guide with server list
 List of VLF-transmitters

Radio spectrum
Radio electronics